Honda Interceptor may refer to:
Honda VF and VFR, introduced in 1982
Honda VF1000, made from 1984 to 1988
Honda VFR800, first produced in 1998
Honda VTR250, two models, one produced 1988–1990; the other produced 1997 onward

Interceptor